Aluminium Stadium,  is located in Nag Hammadi, a city in Upper Egypt. It is the home ground for Aluminium Nag Hammâdi, a football club competing in Egyptian Second Division.

References

Buildings and structures in Qena Governorate
Al Aluminium SC
Football venues in Egypt